Monarch Stadium is a college football stadium located in Fayetteville, North Carolina. The stadium is the home field of the Methodist Monarchs. The stadium originally had grass seating until chair-back seating for 800 was added in 1999. Visitors are seated on portable risers that are set on the outer edge of the stadium's track, opposite to home seating. Visitors and Home fans are required to seat next to each other. The Monarchs compete in the National Collegiate Athletic Association (NCAA) Division III USA South Athletic Conference.

References

College football venues
Methodist Monarchs football
American football venues in North Carolina
Athletics (track and field) venues in North Carolina
Buildings and structures in Fayetteville, North Carolina
Sports venues in Cumberland County, North Carolina
1989 establishments in North Carolina
Sports venues completed in 1989